İnkılap is a railway station in İzmir. The station is served and owned by İZBAN. İnkılap was built in 1970 and rebuilt in 2010.

Railway stations in İzmir Province
Railway stations opened in 1970
1970 establishments in Turkey
Bucak District